Yaroslav Valeryevich Ovsyannikov (born 14 May 1993) is a Russian professional football player.

Club career
He made his Russian Premier League debut for FC Tom Tomsk on 12 March 2012 in a game against FC Volga Nizhny Novgorod.

References

External links
 

1993 births
Sportspeople from Barnaul
Living people
Russian footballers
Russia youth international footballers
Association football defenders
Russian Premier League players
FC Tom Tomsk players
FC Dynamo Barnaul players
FC Volga Ulyanovsk players